Louis Joseph Kusserow  (September 6, 1927 – June 30, 2001) was an American and Canadian football player who played for the Hamilton Tiger-Cats. He won the Grey Cup with them in 1953. Kusserow attended and played football at Columbia University. He was drafted in the 1949 NFL draft by the Detroit Lions in Round 3, #22 overall. In 1949, he played in the All-America Football Conference for the New York Yankees. The following year, he played in the National Football League for the New York Yanks. After his football career, he worked with NBC as an executive.  In 1957, he appeared in an episode of To Tell the Truth as a decoy for baseball player Bobby Brown (third baseman).  He was inducted into the Columbia University Hall of Fame in 2006. In 2001, Kusserow died of prostate cancer.

References

1927 births
2001 deaths
People from Braddock, Pennsylvania
Columbia Lions football players
Hamilton Tiger-Cats players
New York Yankees (AAFC) players
New York Yanks players
Players of American football from Pennsylvania
Deaths from cancer in California